John Gregg (12 January 1939 – 29 May 2021) was an Australian actor. He played in among others: Grass Roots, the Doctor Who tale The Ark in Space, Special Branch, Armchair Thriller, Bodyline, Heatwave, Bootleg, Captain James Cook, Delta, and Done Away with It.

Gregg died on 29 May 2021, aged 82.

Filmography

References

External links
 
 Sydney Swans Tribute

20th-century Australian male actors
Australian actors
1939 births
2021 deaths
People from Tasmania